Faisal bin Khalid Al Saud (Arabic: فيصل بن خالد بن عبد العزيز آل سعود) (born 1954) is the former governor of Asir Region and a member of House of Saud.

Early life and education
Prince Faisal was born in Riyadh in 1954. He is the youngest son of King Khalid. His mother is Sita bint Fahd Al Damir, who died at the age of 90 in Riyadh on 25 December 2012. Faisal bin Khalid studied elementary and middle schools in Jeddah, and studied high school at the Institute of the capital Riyadh model. He completed his undergraduate studies at the College of San Mateo.

Career
Prince Faisal was former deputy governor of Asir Province. He was appointed to this post in August 2003. His tenure lasted for four years. He was appointed governor of Asir Province on 16 May 2007. 

He is chairman of the King Khalid Foundation. He is a member of the Allegiance Council. Faisal bin Khalid was also one of the advisors at the Crown Prince Court. In other words, he was one of the advisors of Crown Prince Nayef. The other two advisors of the Crown Prince were Mohammed bin Fahd and Mishaal bin Abdullah.

Activities as a governor
Faisal bin Khalid was reported to successfully deal with protests by university students in King Khalid University in Abha in March 2012. On the other hand, although he cared for the students' demands, he also declared that such activities were results of those planning to harm the security of the Kingdom and that such plans would not be tolerated.

Personal life and interests
Faisal bin Khalid is a supporter of equestrian stable and he owns Prince Faisal bin Khalid stable (Red Stable), one of the conventional stables in Saudi Arabia.

Ancestry

References

Faisal
1954 births
Children of Khalid of Saudi Arabia
Faisal
Faisal
Living people
Faisal
Faisal